Robert Moresco is an American producer, screenwriter, director and actor. His credits include the films 10th & Wolf and Crash. Moresco's script for Crash won the Academy Award for Best Original Screenplay, which he shared with co-writer Paul Haggis. He was also a co-producer of Crash and has acted in three films and also made guest appearances in shows such as The Equalizer, Miami Vice, and Law & Order. He has written scripts for the television series EZ Streets, Millennium, and The Black Donnellys.

In 2012, Moresco received the Pioneer in Screenwriting Award at the Burbank International Film Festival.

References

External links

 

1951 births
Living people
20th-century American male actors
20th-century American male writers
20th-century American screenwriters
21st-century American male writers
21st-century American screenwriters
American film producers
American male film actors
American male screenwriters
American male television actors
American male television writers
American television producers
American television writers
Best Original Screenplay Academy Award winners
Best Original Screenplay BAFTA Award winners
Film directors from New York City
Film producers from New York (state)
Male actors from New York City
Screenwriters from New York (state)
Television producers from New York City
Writers from New York City
Writers Guild of America Award winners